The 2018 Handzame Classic was the 8th edition of the Handzame Classic road cycling one day race. It was held on 16 March 2018 as part of the UCI Europe Tour in category 1.HC.

Teams
Twenty-two teams of up to seven riders started the race:

Result

References 

Handzame Classic
Handzame Classic
Handzame Classic